The 1923 Cleveland Indians season was their first in the league. The team lost only one game finishing 3–1–3. They finished fifth in the league.

Schedule

Standings

References

Cleveland Bulldogs seasons
Cleveland Indians
Cleveland Bulldogs